John Flower may refer to:

John Flower (sheriff) (1535–1620), MP for Rutland
John Flower (MP), MP for Maldon 1406, 1411, 1414
John Flower (theologian) (c. 1624–after 1658), English nonconformist theologian
John Flower (artist) (1793–1861), English landscape artist
John Flower (cricketer) (born 1938), English cricketer
John Beresford Fowler (1906–1977), English interior designer.

See also
John Flowers (disambiguation)